Rolf on Art was a British art television series made by the BBC. It was hosted by Rolf Harris, the Australian television presenter. The series began in 2001, and the most recent episode was made in 2007. It was followed by Harris's other art programme, Star Portraits with Rolf Harris, which was released after the success of Rolf on Art.

Each episode revolved around Harris looking at a various notable artist from history, and both investigating their life as well as imitating their style of art.

Rolf Harris's style
Unlike many other art presenters, Harris did not just look and talk about an artist's work: he created works in their own style. This was a key part of the shows' success. For each episode, he usually painted two pictures in their style, normally in the same place where they created their works. Some episodes were big events, which were held in a public place, such as Trafalgar Square in London. Harris presented these but many other people (both celebrities and the general public) were enlisted to paint.

Episodes

Series One – The Impressionists

In the first series, from 2001, Harris looked at the Impressionists, a group he has a great affinity for:
 Claude Monet
 Edgar Degas
 Vincent van Gogh
 Paul Gauguin

Series Two – The Post-Impressionists
In the second series, he looked at several artists who worked around and after the time of the Impressionists, but were not Impressionists.
 Henri Rousseau – the French painter of 2D Jungle scenes
 Henri de Toulouse-Lautrec – the French painter of the Moulin Rouge
 Gustav Klimt – the artist who worked in gold leaf
 Auguste Rodin – the famous sculptor

Series Three – 20th-century Masters

 L. S. Lowry – the British painter famous for his stick men style
 Salvador Dalí – the most famous Surrealist
 Pablo Picasso – the famous Cubist
 Paul Cézanne – the French Post-Impressionist
 Marc Chagall – the painter of love scenes
 Andy Warhol – the famous Pop artist

Series Four – Old Masters
 The Big Event ~ John Constable
 Rembrandt van Rijn
 Sandro Botticelli
 J. M. W. Turner
 Bruegel

The Christmas Special
In this special, Harris looked at Christmas card making. The card he produced was mass-produced and sold for charity that year.

The Africa Special
Harris went on a tour of Africa, looking at different styles on African art, including rock art, Makonde wood carving and Benin Bronzes. It was released to coincide with the Live 8 festival in 2005 and the series of programmes on the BBC about Africa.

Series Five – Old Masters
 The Big Event ~ Leonardo da Vinci
 Thomas Gainsborough
 Vermeer
 Goya
 The Big Event ~ Hans Holbein

The Queen, by Rolf
This special, broadcast on BBC One on 1 January 2006, showed the creation of Harris's 80th birthday portrait painting of Queen Elizabeth II. It was highly publicised because the Queen had never been seen on such a programme before. In it, Harris goes to Buckingham Palace where he meets the Queen and paints her in an impressionist style. It is debatable whether it was a part of the Rolf on Art series, because it does not contain the title sequence or Rolf on Art in the title. However, it was advertised as a Rolf on Art special.

Rolf on Lowry
A one-off special, aired on 4 March 2007, where Harris followed in the footsteps of the painter L. S. Lowry. This is different from the season three episode on Lowry.

Rolf on Beatrix Potter
A one-off special, aired on 30 December 2007. Harris looked at the work of illustrator Beatrix Potter.

Rolf on Welsh Art
This series was commissioned by and only shown on BBC One Wales. It aired from the 16 February to the 9th of March 2011. It took the same format as the original series, with each episode focusing on a different Welsh artist. The episode on Shani Rhys James was the first profile of a living artist, meaning as part of the programme Harris was able to meet the artist herself.
 Sir Kyffin Williams
 Josef Herman
 Shani Rhys James
 Graham Sutherland

The second series began airing on 12 October 2012 but has since ended following Harris's 2013 arrest on charges of indecent assault making indecent images of a child.
 Gren Jones
 Augustus John
 Evan Walters
 Brenda Chamberlain

Book
A Rolf on Art book was released for the first series. It contained sections on how he worked, as well as a section on each of the artists he looked at in the series. An updated version was released for the second series.

External links
 

Rolf on Art official site
Rolf on Welsh Art official site
Rolf Harris's website on the series

Rolf Harris

BBC Television shows
2001 British television series debuts
2012 British television series endings
Television series about art
Arts in the United Kingdom
English-language television shows